Austria is scheduled to compete at the 2017 World Aquatics Championships in Budapest, Hungary from 14 July to 30 July.

Diving

Austria has entered 1 diver (one male).

Open water swimming

Austria has entered one open water swimmer

Swimming

Austrian swimmers have achieved qualifying standards in the following events (up to a maximum of 2 swimmers in each event at the A-standard entry time, and 1 at the B-standard):

** Auböck tied for sixteenth place, but elected not to partake in the swim-off.

Synchronized swimming

Austria's synchronized swimming team consisted of 3 athletes (3 female).

Women

 Legend: (R) = Reserve Athlete

References

Nations at the 2017 World Aquatics Championships
Austria at the World Aquatics Championships
2017 in Austrian sport